Jette Jeppesen (born 14 March 1964) is a Danish athlete. She competed in the women's javelin throw at the 1996 Summer Olympics.

References

External links
 

1964 births
Living people
Athletes (track and field) at the 1996 Summer Olympics
Danish female javelin throwers
Olympic athletes of Denmark
People from Hjørring
Sportspeople from the North Jutland Region